Kensington and Chelsea could refer to:

Kensington and Chelsea (UK Parliament constituency), a constituency represented in the House of Commons of the Parliament of the United Kingdom
The Royal Borough of Kensington and Chelsea, a London borough
Kensington and Chelsea London Borough Council, a local authority
Kensington and Chelsea College, a college of further and higher education
Kensington and Chelsea TMO, a tenant management organisation